Emanuel Emegha (born 3 February 2003) is a Dutch professional footballer who plays as a forward for Austrian club Sturm Graz.

Club career
Emegha started his professional career at Sparta Rotterdam in 2020. In his first season he played 16 matches. In the 2021/2022 season, he appeared in every match until January. On 31 January 2022, Emegha signed a five-year contract with Royal Antwerp in Belgium. In August 2022, after having played only a few minutes for Antwerp, he moved to Sturm Graz in Austria and signed a contract for 4 years there.

International career
Born in the Netherlands to a Togolese father and Nigerian mother. He is a youth international for the Netherlands.

Career statistics

Club

Notes

References

2003 births
Living people
Dutch footballers
Netherlands youth international footballers
Dutch people of Togolese descent
Dutch people of Nigerian descent
Association football forwards
Sparta Rotterdam players
Royal Antwerp F.C. players
Eredivisie players
Tweede Divisie players
Dutch expatriate footballers
Expatriate footballers in Belgium
Dutch expatriate sportspeople in Belgium